Haemodorum is a genus of herbs in the family Haemodoraceae, first described as a genus in 1798 by James Edward Smiith. The genus is native to New Guinea and Australia. The type species is Haemodorum corymbosum Vahl, first described by Martin Vahl in 1805.

 species
 Haemodorum austroqueenslandicum Domin - SE Queensland, NE New South Wales
 Haemodorum brevicaule F.Muell. - Queensland, Northern Territory, N Western Australia
 Haemodorum brevisepalum Benth. - SW Western Australia
 Haemodorum coccineum R.Br. - New Guinea, Queensland, Northern Territory
 Haemodorum corymbosum Vahl - New South Wales
 Haemodorum discolor T.D.Macfarl. - SW Western Australia
 Haemodorum distichophyllum Hook. - Tasmania
 Haemodorum ensifolium F.Muell. - NW Northern Territory, N Western Australia
 Haemodorum gracile T.D.Macfarl. - N Western Australia
 Haemodorum laxum R.Br. - SW Western Australia
 Haemodorum loratum T.D.Macfarl. - SW Western Australia
 Haemodorum paniculatum Lindl. - SW Western Australia
 Haemodorum parviflorum Benth. - N Northern Territory, N Western Australia
 Haemodorum planifolium R.Br. - SE Queensland, New South Wales
 Haemodorum simplex Lindl. - SW Western Australia
 Haemodorum simulans F.Muell. - SW Western Australia
 Haemodorum sparsiflorum F.Muell. - SW Western Australia
 Haemodorum spicatum R.Br. - SW Western Australia
 Haemodorum tenuifolium A.Cunn. ex Benth. - SE Queensland, NE New South Wales
 Haemodorum venosum T.D.Macfarl. - SW Western Australia

 formerly included
moved to Hagenbachia 
 Haemodorum brasiliense - Hagenbachia brasiliensis - Brazil

Phylogeny 
Comparison of homologous DNA has increased the understanding of the phylogenetic relationships between the genera in the Haemodoroideae subfamily. The following tree represents those insights.

References 

 
Commelinales genera